John Hunter (1897–1965) was the third bishop of Kimberley and Kuruman from 1943 until  1951. He was educated at Keble College, Oxford, and ordained in  1922. His first post was as a curate in Harrow but his next post was in South Africa (where he was to spend the rest of his career). After a further curacy at St Paul's church in Rondebosch he rose rapidly in the Church hierarchy becoming successively rector of Okiep, Northern Cape; Stellenbosch and finally the cathedral parish at Bloemfontein before his elevation to the episcopate. He was awarded the Coronation Medal and died at George, just after Christmas in 1965, while still in office.

Family
A grandson, Andrew Hunter is the Dean of Grahamstown.

References

External links

1897 births
1965 deaths
Alumni of Keble College, Oxford
Anglican bishops of Kimberley and Kuruman
Anglican bishops of George
20th-century Anglican Church of Southern Africa bishops